12th Costume Designers Guild Awards
February 25, 2010

Contemporary: Crazy Heart 

Period: The Young Victoria 

Fantasy: The Imaginarium of Doctor Parnassus 
The 12th Costume Designers Guild Awards, honoring the best costume designs in film and television for 2009, were given on February 25, 2010. The nominees were announced on January 26, 2010.

Nominees

Film
 Contemporary Film:
 Winner - Doug Hall - Crazy Heart
 Hope Hanafin - (500) Days of Summer
 Jason Alper - Brüno
 Marina Draghici - Precious: Based on the Novel Push by Sapphire
 Danny Glicker - Up in the Air

 Period Film:
 Winner - Sandy Powell - The Young Victoria
 Catherine Leterrier - Coco Before Chanel
 Ann Roth - Julie & Julia
 Colleen Atwood - Nine
 Jenny Beavan - Sherlock Holmes

 Fantasy Film:
 Winner - Monique Prudhomme - The Imaginarium of Doctor Parnassus
 Mayes C. Rubeo & Deborah Lynn Scott - Avatar
 Michael Kaplan - Star Trek

Television
 Made for Television Movie or Miniseries:
 Winner - Catherine Marie Thomas - Grey Gardens
 Michael Dennison - Georgia O'Keeffe
 Barbara Kidd - Little Dorrit

 Contemporary Television Series:
 Winner - Lou Eyrich - Glee
 Chrisi Karvonides-Dushenko - Big Love
 Randall Christensen - Dancing with the Stars
 Jo Katsaras - No. 1 Ladies' Detective Agency
 Patricia Field - Ugly Betty

 Period/Fantasy Television Series:
 Winner - Janie Bryant - Mad Men
 Audrey Fisher - True Blood
 Joan Bergin - The Tudors

Commercial
 Commercial Costume Design:
 Winner - Casey Storm - Milk: Milkquarious

References 

Costume Designers Guild Awards
2009 film awards
2009 in fashion
2010 in American cinema
2010 in American television
2009 television awards